Princess Fitz is a 1945 historical novel by the British writer Winifred Carter. It is based on the life of Maria Fitzherbert, first wife of the future George IV, whose marriage was invalidated by law because she was Catholic.

Film adaptation
In 1947 it was made into a film Mrs. Fitzherbert directed by Montgomery Tully for British National Films and starring Joyce Howard as Fitzherbert and Peter Graves as Prince George.

References

Bibliography
 Goble, Alan. The Complete Index to Literary Sources in Film. Walter de Gruyter, 1999.

1945 British novels
Novels by Winifred Carter
British historical novels
Novels set in London
British novels adapted into films